This is a list of British boxers who have won a world championship by one of the four major sanctioning organisations–the World Boxing Association (WBA), World Boxing Council (WBC), International Boxing Federation (IBF) and the World Boxing Organization (WBO)–as well as those awarded by The Ring. Additionally, prior to 1962, world champions were recognised by public consensus (world), and later by the New York State Athletic Commission (NYSAC) and the National Boxing Association (NBA).

List of champions

Heavyweight

Cruiserweight

Light-heavyweight

Super-middleweight

Middleweight

Light-middleweight

Welterweight

Light-welterweight

Lightweight

Super-featherweight

Featherweight

Super-bantamweight

Bantamweight

Super-flyweight

Flyweight

Light-flyweight

Mini-flyweight

See also
List of WBA world champions
List of WBC world champions
List of IBF world champions
List of WBO world champions
List of The Ring champions

References

British boxers
World boxing champions